Jay King "Babe" Towne (March 12, 1880 – October 29, 1938) was a catcher in Major League Baseball.

Towne began his professional baseball career in 1902 with the Class D Rock Rapids Browns. From 1903-1906, he played for Des Moines of the Class A Western League. In July 1906, Towne was batting .357 when he was purchased by the Chicago White Sox. He played in 14 games and also pinch-hit once in the 1906 World Series, which the White Sox won.

Towne returned to the minor leagues the following year. From 1909-1912, he played for the Western League's Sioux City Packers, managing the team in 1910 and 1911. He batted .333 in 73 games for the 1910 team, which he also managed to 108 wins and the pennant.

He ended his playing and managing career in 1916 in the Central Association.

Towne was born in Coon Rapids, Iowa, and died in Des Moines, Iowa.

References

External links

1880 births
1938 deaths
Major League Baseball catchers
Chicago White Sox players
Rock Rapids Browns players
Des Moines Undertakers players
Des Moines Prohibitionists players
Milwaukee Brewers (minor league) players
Des Moines Underwriters players
Des Moines Champs players
Minneapolis Millers (baseball) players
Burlington Pathfinders players
Sioux City Packers players
Norfolk Drummers players
Fort Dodge Dodgers players
Baseball players from Iowa